Sarah Jane "Jane" Halton  (born 4 January 1960) is a former senior Australian public servant, current global health leader and former casino board member. She was the head of the Department of Health between January 2002 and June 2014, and the head of the Department of Finance from 2014 to 2016. She has held senior board roles with ANZ Bank, Clayton Utz, the Institute for Health Metrics and Evaluation, the Coalition for Epidemic Preparedness Innovations (CEPI) and Crown Casino. She was the Independent Chair of COTA Australia (Council on the Ageing) beginning December 2017. In 2020, she was appointed to the Morrison government's National COVID Commission.

Halton has held concurrent roles within the gambling and casino industry at the same time she has held senior roles within global health organizations - including the Institute for Health Metrics and Evaluation (IHME). She held these conflicting roles despite IHME estimates that "gambling-related burden of harm was 2.5 times more than diabetes and 3.0 times more than drug use disorder". Jane has not explained the rational for holding these competing concurrent roles.

Background and early life
Halton was born on 4 January 1960 in Wickwar, Gloucestershire, England. She and her family moved to Australia in 1973 when her father, Charles Halton, was recruited from Canada by the Whitlam Government to lead the Department of Transport. She has an Honours degree in psychology from the Australian National University.

Career
Halton first joined the Australian Public Service in the Australian Bureau of Statistics.

As a Deputy Secretary in the Department of the Prime Minister and Cabinet, Halton was convener of the People Smuggling Taskforce in the Children Overboard Affair.

Prime Minister John Howard appointed Halton as Secretary of the new Department of Health and Ageing in January 2002. The Department was reformed as the Department of Health in September 2013, when the Abbott Government was elected, and Halton remained at the head. During this time, she was responsible for providing advice to government on issues including the administration of Medicare, the Pharmaceutical Benefits Scheme and private health insurance, and for implementing a $60 billion budget. While she was Health Secretary, Halton led the development of the first Memorandum of Understanding between Medicines Australia and the Australian Government, in 2010.

In June 2014, Halton was appointed Secretary of the Department of Finance. She identified strengthening the performance framework for measuring the impact of Australian Government programs and services as a priority in the role, with a focus on streamlining and providing a greater level of accountability. She also emphasized the scope of work harnessing technology to deliver public services more efficiently across government agencies into different platforms.

Halton announced her resignation, set for 15 October 2016, on 16 September 2016. After stepping down as Secretary, she was appointed to the boards of Crown Casino, the ANZ Bank and Vault Systems. While serving on the board of Crown Casino, and for a period as acting chairman, Halton oversaw Crown Resorts’ response to the Finkelstein Royal Commission investigations around its suitability to hold a casino license - stemming from failures to mitigate money laundering, strong ties to organized criminal networks, and other serious problems with Crown's corporate governance. Halton held concurrent roles within the gambling and casino industry at the same time she held senior roles in global health organizations. She held these conflicting roles despite the IHME estimates that "gambling-related burden of harm was 2.5 times more than diabetes and 3.0 times more than drug use disorder".

Halton is chair of the global Coalition for Epidemic Preparedness Innovations and in March 2020 was appointed to the executive board of the Australian National COVID-19 Coordination Commission.

Awards and honours 
Halton was awarded the Public Service Medal in 2002 and the Centenary Medal in 2003.

In 2014, she was ranked number eight in The Australian Women's Weekly Power List of Australia's 50 most powerful women.

Halton was created an Officer of the Order of Australia in June 2015. She was made an Honorary Fellow of the Australian Academy of Health and Medical Sciences (FAHMS) in 2015.

Notes

References and further reading

1960 births
Living people
Australian National University alumni
People from Wickwar
English emigrants to Australia
Officers of the Order of Australia
Recipients of the Centenary Medal
Recipients of the Public Service Medal (Australia)
Secretaries of the Australian Government Health Department
Secretaries of the Australian Department of Finance
Fellows of the Australian Academy of Health and Medical Sciences